Saint-Gervais-les-Bains-Le Fayet station is a railway station serving the town Saint-Gervais-les-Bains, Haute-Savoie department, southeastern France. It is the southeastern terminus of the standard gauge La Roche-sur-Foron–Saint-Gervais-les-Bains-Le Fayet line from La Roche-sur-Foron, the southwestern terminus of the  gauge Saint-Gervais–Vallorcine line from the Swiss border, and the western terminus of the Mont Blanc Tramway. It is the southeastern terminus of the L3 line of the Léman Express, a suburban rail network for the Grand Genève, which began operation in 2019.

The station is the base for maintenance equipment including a snow plough for the Mont Blanc Express.

Services 
 the following rail services stop at Saint-Gervais-les-Bains-Le Fayet:

 TGV inOui: on weekends during the winter season, two round-trips per day to Paris-Lyon.,
 TER Auvergne-Rhône-Alpes:

There are bus connections to Chamonix-Mont-Blanc, les Contamines, St Gervais Bourg, and Passy.

References

External links 
 
 

Railway stations in Haute-Savoie
Railway stations in France opened in 1898